Massacre Bay may refer to:

 Massacre Bay (Alaska)
 Massacre Bay in New Zealand, the original name for Golden Bay / Mohua
 Massacre Bay (American Samoa), in Aasu, American Samoa; see American Samoa#18th century: First Western contact
 Massacre Bay (Washington)